Chirman-e Olya (also Romanized as Chīrmān-e ‘Olyā; also known as Chermān and Chīrmān) is a village in Tudeshk Rural District, Kuhpayeh District, Isfahan County, Isfahan Province, Iran. At the 2006 census, its population was 140, in 33 families.

References 

Populated places in Isfahan County